The red-tailed ant thrush (Neocossyphus rufus), also known as the red-tailed rufous thrush, is a species of bird in the family Turdidae.  It is found in Cameroon, Central African Republic, Republic of the Congo, Democratic Republic of the Congo, Equatorial Guinea, Gabon, Kenya, Somalia, Tanzania, and Uganda. Its natural habitat is subtropical or tropical moist lowland forests.

References

Neocossyphus
Birds of Central Africa
Birds of East Africa
Birds described in 1884
Taxonomy articles created by Polbot